Innocents with Dirty Hands a.k.a. Dirty Hands, or in the original French Les innocents aux mains sales,  is a 1975 psychological thriller film written and directed by Claude Chabrol from a novel The Damned Innocents by Richard Neely. It stars Romy Schneider and Rod Steiger.

Plot
Louis, a rich man who lives quietly in St Tropez with his beautiful young wife Julie, has cardiac and alcohol problems. They sleep in separate rooms and, when she meets Jeff, a writer, she starts an affair with him. The two decide that she will knock the sleeping Louis unconscious and that Jeff, after dumping the body off a boat, will lie low in Italy. To her dismay, Jeff disappears and, with him, all of Louis' money: she is left without husband, lover, or assets and under police surveillance as a suspect.

Then Louis reappears, apparently fit and alcohol-free: he says he knocked Jeff unconscious and took him to the boat where, after extracting a written confession, he killed him. Claiming that he now wants to be a good husband to Julie, they make love for the first time in years and forgive each other. Then Jeff reappears, with a gun, saying that on the boat Louis could not face killing him. He now wants Julie and the money, but Julie refuses and Louis has a fatal heart attack. As Jeff starts raping Julie, police appear and arrest him.

Principal cast

Reception
The film had 553,910 admissions in France. Of the version shown in the United States, Vincent Canby of The New York Times wrote:

References

External links 

1975 films
1970s psychological thriller films
French psychological thriller films
Italian psychological thriller films
German psychological thriller films
West German films
1970s French-language films
Adultery in films
Films based on American novels
Films directed by Claude Chabrol
Films shot in Saint-Tropez
1970s Italian films
1970s French films
1970s German films